Blasco is a surname which roots can be found it in Aragon, more specifically in the Jaca's mountains.

People 
 Blasco de Garay, Spanish navy captain and inventor
 Blasco de Grañén, Aragonese painter
 Blasco Gardéliz de Ezcároz, bishop of Pamplona
 Blasco Giurato, Italian cinematographer
 Blasco I d'Alagona, Aragonese nobleman
 Blasco II d'Alagona, Sicilian regent
 Blasco Núñez Vela, Spanish viceroy of Peru
 Carl Blasco, French triathlete
 Eduardo Blasco Ferrer, Spanish-Italian linguist
 Elena Blasco (born 1950), Spanish artist
 Eusebio Blasco, Spanish journalist, poet and playwright
 Gregorio Blasco, Spanish footballer
 Humberto Blasco, Paraguayan politician
 Jesús Blasco, Spanish author and artist
 Joan Lerma i Blasco, Spanish politician
 Joe Blasco, American makeup artist
 José Ruiz y Blasco, Spanish painter and art teacher
 Josep Maria Rañé i Blasco, Catalan politician
 Manuel Blasco de Nebra, Spanish organist and composer
 María Blasco Marhuenda, Spanish biologist
 Michele Blasco, Italian painter and architect
 Miguel Blasco, Spanish musical producer
 Miriam Blasco, Spanish judoka
 Paloma Gay y Blasco, social anthropologist
 Ruth Gloria Blasco Ibáñez, American film actress
 Vicente Blasco Ibáñez, Spanish journalist, politician and novelist 
 Víctor Blasco, Spanish footballer
Betty Peterson Blasco (https://en.m.wikipedia.org/wiki/My_Happiness_(1948_song)#)
, Lyricist of “My Happiness”.  
 Amber Blasco, Celebrity Makeup Artist

Other 
 Alicante Bouschet, wine grape variety
 Avenida de Blasco Ibañez, avenue in the Spanish city of Valencia
 Blasco Ibáñez (Madrid Metro), station on Line 1 of the Metro Ligero

See also 
 Blasko (disambiguation page)

de:Blasco